City of Worthington Hills is a home rule-class city in Jefferson County, Kentucky, United States. The population was 1,446 at the 2010 census, down from 1,594 at the 2000 census.

A suburb of Louisville, City of Worthington Hills was separately incorporated by the state legislature on January 31, 1980.

Geography
City of Worthington Hills is located in northeastern Jefferson County at  (38.311389, -85.527500). It is bordered to the north and east by Coldstream and otherwise by consolidated Louisville/Jefferson County.

Demographics

As of the census of 2000, there were 1,594 people, 577 households, and 447 families residing in the city. The racial makeup of the city was 63.68% White, 30.74% African American, 0.06% Native American, 1.69% Asian, 1.88% from other races, and 1.94% from two or more races. Hispanic or Latino of any race were 4.33% of the population.

There were 577 households, out of which 44.2% had children under the age of 18 living with them, 60.0% were married couples living together, 13.9% had a female householder with no husband present, and 22.5% were non-families. 17.7% of all households were made up of individuals, and 0.7% had someone living alone who was 65 years of age or older. The average household size was 2.76 and the average family size was 3.12.

In the city, the population was spread out, with 28.3% under the age of 18, 8.7% from 18 to 24, 40.3% from 25 to 44, 20.5% from 45 to 64, and 2.2% who were 65 years of age or older. The median age was 31 years. For every 100 females, there were 93.2 males. For every 100 females age 18 and over, there were 92.1 males.

The median income for a household in the city was $56,250, and the median income for a family was $58,500. Males had a median income of $40,278 versus $27,162 for females. The per capita income for the city was $22,199. About 3.5% of families and 2.9% of the population were below the poverty line, including 1.8% of those under age 18 and 7.5% of those age 65 or over.

References

External links
City of Worthington Hills official website

Cities in Jefferson County, Kentucky
Cities in Kentucky
Louisville metropolitan area
Populated places established in 1980